Wayne Knox (June 30, 1927 - July 21, 2019) was a former politician in the American state of Colorado. He served in the Colorado House of Representatives from 1960 to 1962 and 1975 to 1996. A retired teacher, Knox was a native to Denver and served as a Democrat.

References

1927 births
2019 deaths
Politicians from Denver
Democratic Party members of the Colorado House of Representatives
Educators from Colorado